Azimpur Government Girls' School and College is a secondary and higher secondary school in Azimpur, Dhaka, Bangladesh. It was established in 1957 by the Welfare Association of Government Employees. In 1999 the school had an enrollment of some 2,700 students and a faculty of 82.

The institution is known for its cultural activities. It hosts educational events like Bangladesh Mathematics Olympiad and Bhasha Protijog. The school celebrated its Golden Jubilee and reunion in 2007.

The school started its classes in 1957. The first Head Master was Kazi Ambor Ali. In 1995, Azimpur Girls’ College was established on the school campus. Both school and college united into a single institution in 1999.

It has nearly 7000 students and 92 teachers in total. The Principal is Geetanjali barua. Property of the institution includes 4 buildings, a large playground, a duplex auditorium 
and a residence for the principal.

Notable alumnus 
Sheikh Hasina - Prime Minister of Bangladesh (1996-2001) and (2009–present)

References

Schools in Dhaka District
Educational institutions established in 1957
Girls' schools in Bangladesh
1957 establishments in East Pakistan